The 1741 English cricket season was the 45th cricket season since the earliest recorded eleven-a-side match was played. Details have survived of nine significant matches, including the first known appearance of Slindon Cricket Club. The earliest known tie in an eleven-a-side match occurred.

Recorded matches 
Records have survived of nine significant matches:

A single-wicket match was played on 8 June between five players of London and five of Surrey at the Artillery Ground for £20 a side. The result is unknown.

Other events
The earliest known match in Bedfordshire took place on 10 August involving Bedfordshire and a team from Huntingdonshire and Northamptonshire. The match was hosted by John Russell, 4th Duke of Bedford, who captained Bedfordshire. The Northants/Hunts team included its patrons George Montagu-Dunk, 2nd Earl of Halifax (Northants) and John Montagu, 4th Earl of Sandwich (Hunts). A further match followed between the two teams at Cow Meadow, Northampton on 15 August which is the earliest known match in Northamptonshire.

There was a match at Wotton Underwood in Buckinghamshire that was reportedly attended by 6,000 people. Details, including the date, are unknown except that the patrons were the Duke of Bedford (who lost) and Richard Grenville.

Among the main primary sources for the events of the 1741 season are letters written by Charles Lennox, 2nd Duke of Richmond and his wife Duchess Sarah. The Duchess took a keen interest in all the Duke's doings including his cricket. Several references and letters written by her, including some financial accounts, have survived. In other letters to Thomas Pelham-Holles, 1st Duke of Newcastle, the Duke spoke about a game on 28 July which resulted in a brawl with "hearty blows" and "broken heads." The game was at Portslade between Slindon and unnamed opponents.

First mentions

Counties
 Bedfordshire
 Buckinghamshire

Clubs and teams
 Portsmouth
 Slindon Cricket Club

Players
 John Russell, 4th Duke of Bedford (Bedfordshire)
 George Montagu-Dunk, 2nd Earl of Halifax (Northamptonshire)
 John Montagu, 4th Earl of Sandwich (Huntingdonshire)
 Richard Grenville (Buckinghamshire)

Venues
 Charlwood
 Cow Meadow, Northampton
 Stansted Park
 Woburn Park

References

Bibliography

Further reading
 
 
 
 
 

1741 in English cricket
English cricket seasons in the 18th century